The 2013–14 OB I bajnoksag season is the 77th season of the OB I bajnoksag, the top level of ice hockey in Hungary. The league proper was not contested this season, as four of the top Hungarian teams competed in the multi-national MOL Liga. The top-ranked Hungarian team in the league was crowned national champions. Dab.Docler was recognized as Hungarian champion this year.

Teams

Results
Game by game results can be viewed here

References

OB I bajnoksag seasons
Hun
OB